Krishan Dev Dewan is an Indian social worker and the founder of Vaishali Area Small Farmers Association, a non governmental organization for the welfare of the farmers in Vaishali, in the Indian state of Bihar. He is known to have organised the refugee farmers of Nilokheri for making them self-reliant. His activities at Vaishali has been listed by the Food and Agriculture Organization, placing them under Peoples participation in development. The Government of India awarded him the fourth highest Indian civilian honour of Padma Shri in 1986.

See also

 Food and Agriculture Organization

References

Recipients of the Padma Shri in social work
Year of birth missing (living people)
Social workers
Living people
Social workers from Bihar